Cyril Fagan (born Dublin, Ireland, May 22, 1896, died Tucson, Arizona, United States, January 5, 1970) was an Irish astrologer,
Generally considered the father - alongside Donald A. Bradley, the mother, of Sidereal astrology. He is the creator with American astrologer Bradley of the Fagan-Bradley Ayanamsha.

His books include:

Astrological Origins, Zodiacs Old and New St. Paul, Minn.: Llewellyn Publications, 1971.
 Fixed Zodiac Ephemeris for 1948. Washington, D.C.: National Astrological Library, 1948.
A Primer of the Sidereal Zodiac
Zodiacs Old and New. Los Angeles: Llewellyn Publications, 1950.

References

Holden, James H., and Robert A. Hughes. Astrological Pioneers of America. Tempe, Ariz.: American Federation of Astrologers, 1988.

External links
Short biography
Overview of Fagan's work

1896 births
1970 deaths
Writers from Dublin (city)
20th-century astrologers
American astrologers
Irish astrologers
20th-century American male writers
Irish emigrants to the United States